The Carnegie Free Library was added to the National Register of Historic Places in 1988.

History
The library was built with a gift of $12,500 from Andrew Carnegie. It was largely built out of limestone.

References

Library buildings completed in 1913
Libraries on the National Register of Historic Places in Wisconsin
Sturgeon Bay
Buildings and structures in Door County, Wisconsin
Limestone buildings in the United States
Neoclassical architecture in Wisconsin
1913 establishments in Wisconsin
National Register of Historic Places in Door County, Wisconsin